Super Roots 6 is the fifth installment in the Super Roots EP series by noise rock band Boredoms, released in 1996 by WEA Japan. In the USA, it was numbered and priced as a standard album.

Track listing
"01" – 1:42
"0 (x12)" – 0:57
"6" – 6:08
"2" – 5:19
"3" – 5:44
"9" – 6:04
"4" – 1:20
"7" – 5:38
"8" – 4:05
"5" – 5:00
"10" – 6:06
"11" – 3:49
"12" – 3:30
"13" – 3:07
"14" – 3:29
"15" – 3:16
"1" – 1:01

(Note: The track titled "7" on this release is different than the track titled "7" on Rebore, vol. 0.)

References

Boredoms EPs
1996 EPs
Reprise Records EPs